Helme Parish was a rural municipality of Estonia, in Valga County. It had a population of 2,525 (as of 1 January 2009) and an area of 312.73 km2.

Geography

Populated places
There was small borough Helme and 14 villages in Helme Parish. The villages were: Ala, Holdre, Jõgeveste, Kähu, Kalme, Karjatnurme, Kirikuküla, Koorküla, Linna, Möldre, Patküla, Pilpa, Roobe and Taagepera.

Gallery

References

External links
Official website